Ágoston Scholtz (1844–1916) was a Hungarian mathematician, one of the founders of the Hungarian Mathematics and Physics Association.

Life and work 
Scholtz attended the schools of Igló (now Spišská Nová Ves), Rosenau (now Rožňava) and Löcse (now Levoča). After his secondary education he studied in the universities of Vienna and Berlin, graduating in 1865. After teaching several years at secondary level, he obtained the university habilitation in 1879 and began his teaching in the Hungarian Royal University of Budapest (now Loránd Eötvös University).

Scholtz's field of research was projective geometry and theory of determinants. He collaborated extensively with Jenő Hunyady, for this reason both names are associated with their results: Hunyadi–Scholtz determinant theorem and Hunyadi–Scholtz matrix.

References

Bibliography

External links 
 

1844 births
1916 deaths
Hungarian Lutherans
19th-century Hungarian mathematicians
20th-century Hungarian mathematicians
19th-century Lutherans